The 2014 Trinidad and Tobago Goal Shield was the fifth season of the Lucozade Sport Goal Shield, which is a knockout tournament competition for Trinidad and Tobago teams competing in the TT Pro League. W Connection entered as the cup holders having defeated North East Stars 4–3 in a penalty shootout in the 2013 final. Continuing from previous seasons, the competition not only allowed the winner and runner-up healthy purses at the end of the tournament, but more so give an added incentive for more goals to be scored throughout the tournament. In particular, the winner of the competition was awarded TT$30,000 plus an additional TT$3,000 for every goal scored in the final, TT$2,000 for every goal in the semifinals, and TT$1,000 for each goal scored in the quarterfinals. Whereas, the runner-up was awarded TT$10,000 plus TT$1,500 for every goal scored in the final, TT$1,000 for every goal in the semifinals, and TT$500 for each goal scored in the quarterfinals.

Qualification
Since the league expanded to nine clubs for the 2013–14 TT Pro League season, the competition re-introduced the qualifying round to narrow the number of teams prior to the quarterfinals. Seeding was determined from the league standings at the end of fixtures held on 29 March 2014. W Connection entered the competition as the league leader and top seeded team in the competition. The remaining top seeds were Central FC, North East Stars, and Point Fortin Civic after placing second, third, and fourth, respectively, in the league table at the time of the draw.

The draw for the quarterfinals took place on 31 March 2014 at the Capital Plaza in Port of Spain. The quarterfinal matches to be played on 4 April in Ato Boldon Stadium resulted in Central FC facing Caledonia AIA and Point Fortin Civic against Defence Force. The following night in Couva, W Connection will face the winner of the qualifying round between the bottom two in the league table, San Juan Jabloteh and St. Ann's Rangers, and North East Stars against Police.

Schedule
The schedule for the 2014 Lucozade Sport Goal Shield, as announced by the TT Pro League:

Bracket

Results
All matches were played for 90 minutes duration, at the end of which if the match was still tied, penalty-kicks were used to determine the match winner.

Qualifying round
The competition kicked off with the qualifying round between the San Juan Jabloteh and St. Ann's Rangers, which represented the bottom of the 2013–14 TT Pro League league table. The San Juan Kings used goals on either side of the half from Jean-Luc Rochford and Micah Lewis, respectively, to advance to the quarterfinals to face W Connection.

Quarterfinals
In the quarterfinals, all four of the higher seeds progressed. In the early match in Couva on 4 April, Central FC easily defeated the Stallions of Morvant/Laventille with a 4–0 win, which included a first-half brace from Willis Plaza. However, the Akini Adams stole the spotlight in the late match between Point Fortin Civic and Defence Force. Acting as a stand-in goalkeeper, Adams saved two kicks in the penalty shootout, after the match ended 1–1, to help Point Fortin advance to the semifinals. After the match, Adams dedicated the win to his brother Akeem Adams, who died on 30 December 2013 from a heart attack suffered in September while playing for Ferencváros in Hungary. The following day, W Connection won convincingly over San Juan Jabloteh after scoring three goals in the first half. North East Stars used a brace from Keron Cummings to upend Police and advance to the semifinals.

Semifinals
On 11 April, W Connection and Central FC won their semifinal contests to advance to the final on 25 April at Ato Boldon Stadium in Couva. In the first semifinal, Central FC defeated North East Stars 2–0 following goals from their two young strikers; Dwight Quintero and Rundell Winchester on either side of half-time. W Connection used a lone goal from Hashim Arcia in the 53rd minute to defeat Point Fortin Civic 1–0.

Final
In the final on 25 April, Central FC scored two goals in succession from Rundell Winchester and Marvin Oliver to power the Couva Sharks to their first Goal Shield title. For his performance in the final, Winchester was named the Most Valuable Player after providing his second goal of the tournament and setting up the winning goal from Oliver.

References

External links
Official Website

2014 Lucozade Sport Goal Shield
Goal Shield